Holland Football Club is a football club based in Holland-on-Sea, Essex, England.

History
The club was established in 2006, and joined Division Two of the Essex & Suffolk Border League in the same year. They won the Tommy Thompson Cup in their first season in the league. Division Two was disbanded at the end of the 2006–07 season and the club moved up to Division One. In 2008–09 they won Division One, earning promotion to the Premier Division; the season also saw them win the Essex Premier Cup, beating Maldon St Mary's 1–0 in the final. After finishing fourth in the Premier Division in 2014–15, the club applied for promotion to the Eastern Counties League, but  were rejected as they had proposed groundsharing with F.C. Clacton, with FA rules stating that groundshares should have been in place for at least a year prior to promotion.

However, after finishing third in 2015–16, promotion to Division One of the Eastern Counties League was achieved.

Ground
The club initially played at the Eastcliff Recreation Ground on Dulwich Road. Plans for a stadium upgrade were dropped in 2015, and the club agreed to groundshare with F.C. Clacton at their Rush Green Bowl ground due to building works at Eastcliff. In 2018 the club returned to Dulwich Road after a £550,000 upgrade that involved installing a new stand and rotating the pitch 90°.

Honours
Essex & Suffolk Border League
Division One champions 2008–09
Tommy Thompson Cup winners 2006–07
Essex Premier Cup
Winners 2008–09

See also
Holland F.C. players

References

External links
Official website

Football clubs in England
Football clubs in Essex
Association football clubs established in 2006
2006 establishments in England
Essex and Suffolk Border Football League
Eastern Counties Football League